Alien Boys were a German rock band from Hamburg, Germany. They formed in 1987 and were one of the first European grunge bands but also associated with the doom metal genre. After two independent albums and a lot of touring, especially in the United States, they got signed to Gun Records/BMG and released their third album, Doom Picnic, produced by grunge pioneer Jack Endino. After their fourth album, Nekropolis, the group disbanded in 1994. Andi Schmidt and Ronnie Henseler later formed The Punkles, in the 2000s Schmidt and Beege played together in the proto punk band Nixon Now.

Members
Andi Schmidt (vocals)
Ronnie Henseler (bass)
Tom Beege († 2020) (guitar)
Peter Stein (drums)

Albums
 Lawmachine (1989 - Anaconda Records) 
 The Seeds Of Decay (1991 - Rave Records)
 Doom Picnic (1992 - Gun Records)
 Nekropolis (1993 - Gun Records)

References

External links
 
 
 Encyclopaedia Metallum: The Metal Archives

Musical groups established in 1987
Musical groups from Hamburg
Grunge musical groups
Sludge metal musical groups
German doom metal musical groups
GUN Records artists